Waldau Army Airfield is a former military airfield, located 4.0 km south of Kassel in Hesse, Germany.

History
The airfield was built in 1918, and had its first building in 1924, the same year it was officially opened. From 1926 it was regularly serviced by airliners, primarily Lufthansa. The first successful airplane tow of a glider was done at Waldau airfield on 12 March 1927 by World War I flying ace and aerobatic champion Gerhard Fieseler in the tow plane and Gottlob Espenlaub in the glider.

Gerhard Fieseler set up his aircraft production plants at Kassel from 1930 as Fieseler Flugzeugbau. One of them (Werk III, or Plant III) was at Waldau airfield, another one ony one mile from the airfield. That same year the airline connection ended, when Waldau had to close as a city airfield because Kassel could no longer afford to pay Lufthansa for its services or the maintenance of the airfield.  Ownership of the airfield was then transferred to the Lower Hessian Association for Aviation. Still, the airfield remained open, and it attracted a 100,000 crowd during the visit of a Zeppelin airship in September 1930.

Aircraft Fieseler produced at Waldau amongst others:.
 Fieseler Fi 2 a German aerobatic biplane built in the 1930s.
 Fieseler Fi 5 a single-engined two-seat sportplane of the 1930s, and later used as a Luftwaffe trainer.
 Fieseler Fi 98, a prototype ground-attack aircraft (before World War II).
 Fieseler Fi 167 a biplane torpedo and reconnaissance bomber designed for the new aircraft carriers being planned. (before World War II).
 Fieseler Fi 156 Storch, a STOL observation/liaison aircraft (from 1936 until 1943).
 Messerschmitt Bf 109 fighter (licence production).
 Focke-Wulf Fw 190 fighter (licence production, from 1943 onwards).
 Fieseler Fi 103, better known as the V-1 flying bomb "Buzz bomb", an early pulse-jet-powered predecessor of the cruise missile (1944-1945).

At times the plants used 10,000 working men and women, many of them slave labor from the Netherlands and France. As a result, the Fieseler plants regularly were attacked by American Eighth Air Force and British RAF Bomber Command aircraft, and although some damage was done to the plants, most destruction occurred in the city itself.

The damaged airfield was seized by American Army units on 4 April 1945.  The damaged airfield was repaired by IX Engineering Command, Ninth Air Force and re-designated as "Advanced Landing Ground Y-96".  American Army Air Force units used the airfield as a casualty evacuation and combat resupply airfield by the IX Air Service Command, as well as a combat airfield by the 48th Fighter Group with P-47 Thunderbolts operating for two weeks until the German capitulation on 8 May.

After the end of combat, the facility was re-designed as "AAF Station Kassel/Waldau" and later Waldau Tactical Air Depot (TAD) under Air Service Command, operated by 10th Air Depot Group. In November 1945, Air Force units moved out and control of the facility was turned over to the United States Army. The airfield remained closed to civilian traffic until 29 April 1955, when it was returned to the city of Kassel for civilian use as an airport, the US Army retaining control of the base station and renaming the facility "Waldau Kaserne".  The Army used the station for vehicle maintenance by 547th Ordnance Co which supported transportation units.   In 1970, the Army inactivated the facility.

By the early 1960s, however, urban encroachment in the area made it clear the civil airport could not remain open much longer. It was located in the eastern side of the city with no room for expansion and residential areas were becoming hard to avoid. When the city of Kassel opened a new airport to the north of the city in July 1970, Waldau was closed and converted to an industrial area.    The airfield remained in existence until the 1980s, when it was torn up and the area redeveloped.

References
  Y-96 Kassel/Waldau
 Kassel Waldau AFA
 Johnson, David C. (1988), U.S. Army Air Forces Continental Airfields (ETO), D-Day to V-E Day; Research Division, USAF Historical Research Center, Maxwell AFB, Alabama.

World War II airfields in Germany
Airports established in 1944
Kassel-Waldau